Nikka Zaildar 3 is a 2019 Indian Punjabi-language romantic-comedy film directed by Simerjit Singh from a screenplay co-written by Jagdeep Sidhu and Gurpreet Singh Palheri. The film is third instalment of Nikka Zaildar film series. Co-produced by Viacom18 Studios and Patiala Motion Pictures, it stars Ammy Virk, Wamiqa Gabbi, Sonia Kour, and Nirmal Rishi in lead roles. The film chronicles the story of Nikka whose father's soul enters his body following his death. It also stars Sardar Sohi, Hardeep Gill, Baninder Bunny, Gurmeet Saajan, and Jagdeep Randhawa in supporting roles. The film was released on 20 September 2019.The film received negative reviews from critics.

Plot

Cast 

 Ammy Virk as Nikka Zaildar
 Wamiqa Gabbi as Palpreet
 Sonia Kaur as Dimple
 Nirmal Rishi as Bebe
 Sardar Sohi as Visaakha Zaildar
 Gurmeet Saajan
 Jagdeep Randhawa
 Hardeep Gill
 Baninderjit Singh Bunny
 Nisha Bano as Shanti
 Parminder Gill as Mother

Soundtrack

Soundtrack of the film is composed by Gurmeet Singh, Rick Hrt & Kuwar Brar while the background score is composed by Jatinder Shah. Lyrics are by Kaptaan, Simer Doraha and Happy Raikoti.

Production 

Principal photography of the film took place in different schedules, it began on 2 February 2019, and last schedule took place in August 2019 with Akashdeep Pandey serving as a cinematographer.

Release and marketing 

The film was announced in September 2018 with a cartoonized poster. The film was originally scheduled to be released on 21 June 2019 but was postponed to 20 September 2019. The film was released on 350 screens in Punjab. First look poster of the film was released on 16 August 2019. Official trailer of the film was released on 2 September 2019.

Scoops

Nirmal Rishi's character 
Jagdeep Sidhu revealed that his great-grandmother was the original Dilip Kaur (Nirmal Rishi), and she inspired the Nikka Zaildar character Dilip Kaur.

Reception

Box office 
Nikka Zaildar 3 grossed ₹1.3 crore nett on its opening day, making it second-highest nett grossing Punjabi film on opening day of the year after Shadaa (₹2.3 crore nett). Also, the film had better opening than all other new Hindi releases. The film grossed ₹9.45 crore in its opening weekend worldwide, making it one of the highest opening Punjabi films. As of 4 October 2019 the film has grossed ₹16.2 Crore Worldwide. As of 11 October2019 the film has grossed 22.4 core worldwide.

Critical response 
Gurnaaz Kaur of The Tribune gave two and a half star out of five and described the film as "laugh riot". Kaur called the story "senseless" but praised the message embedded in it for superstitions. She praised the performances of Ammy Virk, Wamiqa Gabbi, Sonia, Nirmal Rishi and Sardar Sohi. Also, she praised the music, sound and the direction by Simerjit Singh.

References

External links 
 

2019 films
Punjabi-language Indian films
2010s Punjabi-language films
Indian romantic comedy films
Indian sequel films
Films directed by Simerjit Singh
2019 romantic comedy films